David Porecki (born 23 October 1992 in Australia) is an Australian rugby union player who plays for the  in Super Rugby and the Australian national team, the wallabies. His playing position is hooker.

Rugby career

Domestic
Porecki made one brief appearance off the bench for Waratahs against Cheetahs during the 2015 Super Rugby season. He joined Saracens as cover during the 2015 Rugby World Cup. Porecki was eligible to represent England as his mother is from that country. In 2016 he left Saracens to join London Irish and in his first season at the club was part of the side that defeated Yorkshire Carnegie in the RFU Championship play-off final to win promotion back to the Premiership.

In July 2020 it was confirmed that Porecki would return to the Waratahs for their Super Rugby campaign.

International
On 2 July 2022 Porecki made his debut for Australia starting in a win against England at Perth Stadium.

Reference list

External links
Ultimate Rugby profile
 

1992 births
Living people
Australian rugby union players
Rugby union hookers
Sydney (NRC team) players
New South Wales Waratahs players
Saracens F.C. players
London Irish players
Rugby union players from Sydney
Australia international rugby union players
Australian people of English descent